Jonathan Michael Avnet (born November 17, 1949), is an American director, writer and producer.

Early life and education
Avnet was born in Brooklyn, the son of Joan Bertha (née Grossman) and Lester Francis Avnet, a corporate executive with Avnet (a Global distributor of IT & electronics) founded by his grandfather, Charles Avnet. He has two siblings, Carole Avnet Rocherolle and Rosalind Avnet Lazarus. He attended Great Neck North High School in Great Neck, New York. He earned a B.A. degree in film and theater arts from Sarah Lawrence College in 1971. He is Jewish.

Career
Before that Jon Avnet partnered with Steve Tisch on his production company, before teaming up with McNeil/Allyn Films on motion pictures and television movies.

Avnet directed his first movie, Fried Green Tomatoes, in 1991, followed by The War in 1994, with Elijah Wood in the lead and Kevin Costner in a supporting role as his father. He directed Up Close & Personal  in 1996, which was loosely based on the life of Jessica Savitch. It was written by Joan Didion and John Gregory Dunne and starred Robert Redford and Michelle Pfeiffer.

Avnet addressed political issues with his fourth film Red Corner in 1997, a movie about the Chinese legal system, starring Richard Gere and Bai Ling. Because of Gere's presence and support for Tibet and the Dalai Lama, they could not film in China, and the settings had to be recreated in Southern California. Avnet, however, did film a few scenes in Beijing and also put in some footage of actual Chinese executions. Avnet was also the executive producer of the 2010 movie Black Swan. His production company is Brooklyn Films.

Personal life
Avnet has been married to the artist Barbara Brody since 1975. They have three children, Alexandra Avnet Costantino, Jacob Avnet, and Lily Avnet.

Filmography

Film

Television

References

External links
 

1949 births
Film producers from New York (state)
AFI Conservatory alumni
American television directors
Jewish American writers
Jewish American film producers
Jewish American film directors
Living people
Writers from Brooklyn
Sarah Lawrence College alumni
Great Neck North High School alumni
Film directors from New York City
21st-century American Jews